The Pepper Building is a historic commercial building located at Winston-Salem, Forsyth County, North Carolina.  It was designed by the architectural firm Northup and O'Brien and built in 1928.  It is a six-story, brick building with Art Deco style detailing.  It has a flat, parapeted roof and terra cotta decorative elements, including lions' heads and pilasters.  The building originally housed a department store.

It was listed on the National Register of Historic Places in 2014.

References

Commercial buildings on the National Register of Historic Places in North Carolina
Art Deco architecture in North Carolina
Commercial buildings completed in 1928
1928 establishments in North Carolina
National Register of Historic Places in Winston-Salem, North Carolina